Rajasthan is one of the largest states of India followed by Madhya Pradesh, Maharashtra and Uttar Pradesh. It is located at the northwestern side of India and also known as Great Indian Desert. At present, there are 7 airports in Rajasthan. These airports are located in Jaipur, Udaipur, Jailsalmer, Jodhpur, Bikaner and Kota. However, Kota is not operating any commercial flights, whereas other airports are running operational flights throughout the country.There is only 1 international airport and others are civil and domestic airports.

List

References

Rajasthan
Buildings and structures in Rajasthan
Airports in Rajasthan